The Pa Sak Jolasid Dam or Pa Sak Cholasit Dam impounds the Pa Sak River at Ban Kaeng Suea Ten, Tambon Nong Bua, Phatthana Nikhom District, Lopburi Province, and Ban Kham Phran, Tambon Kham Phran, Wang Muang District, Saraburi Province, Thailand. It is the biggest reservoir in central Thailand.

The storage capacity is 785 million m3 of water at normal water level, with a maximum capacity of 960 million m3. The dam also supplies about 6.7 MW of hydro-electric power.

History

The Pa Sak Cholasit Dam Project is one of the major irrigation projects of Thailand, providing water to the plantations in the Pa Sak valley and lower Chao Phraya valley. The dam also decreases problems of water management in Bangkok by permitting more flood control, as the Pa Sak river was one of the main sources of flooding in the Bangkok metropolitan area.

King Bhumibol Adulyadej initiated a project to develop the Pa Sak River valley and lower Chao Phraya valley on 19 February 1989 as part of the Maenam Pa Sak Royal Development Project. On 4 July 1991 Prime Minister Anand Panyarachun set up a study group for the dam project. Princess Maha Chakri Sirindhorn presided over a royal ceremony on 15 June 1998, starting the storing of water in the reservoir.

On 20 October 1991 King Bhumibol Adulyadej gave the dam  its official name, Pa Sak Cholasit. The king also presided over the inauguration of the dam on 25 November 1999. The park is now also a tourist attraction .

Railway

The construction of the dam meant that the original line of the Northeastern Line Kaeng Khoi-Bua Yai Branch Line would be submerged under the reservoir. Therefore a railway viaduct was constructed in 1998 as a realignment of the line. It opened on 15 June 1998, along with the Pa Sak Jolasid Dam Railway Halt which was constructed to boost tourism in the area.

From November to January of the following year annually, for a total of three months, the State Railway of Thailand (SRT) operates a special train known from Bangkok to Pa Sak Jolasid Dam. It operates only on weekends. The main highlight of this trip is when the train stops on the railway viaduct, allowing passengers to stroll and take pictures.

References

External links

Pa Sak Cholasit Dam project
Pa Sak Cholasit Dam history

Dams in Thailand
Buildings and structures in Lopburi province
Buildings and structures in Saraburi province
Tourist attractions in Lopburi province
Tourist attractions in Saraburi province
Earth-filled dams
Hydroelectric power stations in Thailand
Dams completed in 1999
Energy infrastructure completed in 1999
1999 establishments in Thailand
Dong Phaya Yen Mountains